Stewart Cheifet (born September 24, 1938) is an American television presenter, best known for his work presenting and producing Computer Chronicles and Net Cafe. He has also worked in other reporting positions for PBS and ABC, and others. Raised in Philadelphia, he attended Central High School and graduated from the University of Southern California in 1960 with a degree in psychology and mathematics and went on to graduate from Harvard Law School. Cheifet teaches journalism classes at the Donald W. Reynolds School of Journalism at the University of Nevada, Reno.

References

Further reading 
 Vance, Hailee, "Cheifet brings professional expertise to broadcast students", The Reynolds School, University of Nevada, Reno.

External links

cheifet.com —- Stewart Cheifet Productions

Harvard Law School alumni
University of Southern California alumni
Living people
University of Nevada, Reno faculty
1938 births
20th-century American Jews
21st-century American Jews
American television hosts
People from Philadelphia